This page shows the standings and results for Group H of the UEFA Euro 2012 qualifying tournament.

Standings

Matches
Group H fixtures were to be negotiated between the participants in a meeting held in Copenhagen on 8 March. After that meeting proved inconclusive, the fixture list was determined by a random draw at the XXXIV Ordinary UEFA Congress in Tel Aviv, Israel, on 25 March.

Goalscorers

Discipline

References 

Group H
2010–11 in Portuguese football
2011–12 in Portuguese football
Portugal at UEFA Euro 2012
2010–11 in Cypriot football
2011–12 in Cypriot football
2010–11 in Danish football
Qual
2010 in Icelandic football
2011 in Icelandic football
2010 in Norwegian football
2011 in Norwegian football